Captain Robert C. Truax (USN) (September 3, 1917 – September 17, 2010) was an American rocket engineer in the United States Navy, and companies such as Aerojet and Truax Engineering, which he founded. Truax was a proponent of low-cost rocket engine and vehicle designs.

Life
As a teenager, Truax was inspired by Robert Goddard articles in Popular Mechanics magazine to build his own rockets while residing in Alameda, California. From 1936 to 1939, midshipman Truax tested liquid-fuel rocket motors and published a February 1939 report in Astronautics. In 1938, he showed a thrust chamber that he had constructed to the British Interplanetary Society and wrote technical reports published by the American Rocket Society.

Truax headed the Navy Development Project (ensigns R. C. Stiff, J. F. Patton, W. Schubert and MIT civilian Robertson Youngquist), where hypergolic propellant was discovered—fuel that burst into flame spontaneously when brought into contact with nitric acid, leading to the use of aniline plus 20% furfuryl alcohol for the 1945 WAC Corporal (the first free-flight rocket to use the fuel). By early 1943, the Truax group had developed a  thrust JATO using hypergolic fuel before the introduction of solid fuel JATO units.

From 1955 to 1958, Truax was assigned to the United States Air Force under General Bernard A. Schriever, where Truax and Dr. Adolf Thiel headed the initial design studies and IRBM specifications for the PGM-17 Thor missile. Truax subsequently worked on the Navy's Viking rocket and UGM-27 Polaris missile. Truax studied the sea launching of rockets, such as the Sea Bee and Sea Horse projects. After serving as 1957 American Rocket Society president, Truax retired from the United States Navy in 1959 and headed the Aerojet-General Advanced Development Division and Aerojet's Sea Dragon project.

Truax died from prostate cancer at his home in Valley Center, California on September 17, 2010.

Truax Engineering
In 1966 Robert Truax founded Truax Engineering, which studied sea launch concepts similar to the earlier Sea Dragon—the Excalibur, the SEALAR, and the Excalibur S.

Truax also designed the Skycycle X-2, which he unsuccessfully tested on April 15, 1972 and June 24, 1973, and which Evel Knievel unsuccessfully used at the Snake River Canyon in 1974.

Volksrocket

The X-3 Volksrocket (other names: Arriba One, Skycycle X-3) was a reusable space tourism rocket planned by Robert Truax after Evel Knievel provided a $1,000 research grant for a pilot study. Truax was looking for volunteers with enough money to help fund the effort and who wished to fly aboard his rocket. He got thousands of volunteers, but few of them had the financial resources. One person selected to fly in the rocket was engineer Jeana Yeager, who worked for Truax Engineering.  Peruvian-born Daniel J. Correa was at one point announced as the first pilot. Among others who offered some financing and who went through some of his training were Ronald Beller, a pilot from Kentucky, Martin Yahn, Ray Upton, and Fell Peters, all of southern California. Ultimately, no one flew in the Volksrocket.

The rocket used surplus components and was tested through 1991.

References and notes

External links
Truax Transportation Collection

1917 births
2010 deaths
American aerospace engineers
Rocket scientists
Humboldt University of Berlin alumni
Iowa State University alumni
Naval Postgraduate School alumni
United States Naval Academy alumni
United States Navy officers
Deaths from prostate cancer
People from Gary, Indiana
People from Alameda, California
Space advocates
Military personnel from California
Members of the American Rocket Society